This is a list of rallies held by Donald Trump for his 2016 presidential campaign. During the campaign, a total of 323 rallies were held: 186 for the primary season and 137 for the general election with total people attendance of around 1.4M+ (790K+  during primary elections and 650K+ for the general elections).

Primary season

General election season

Post-election 

 "USA Thank You" tour during transition
 Post-inauguration/campaign 2020 rallies (2017–2020)

Musical selections at events 

Music by the following artists and groups was used at various Trump campaign rallies during 2015 and 2016:  Elton John, The Beatles, Adele, Andrew Lloyd Webber, Pavarotti / Puccini, Journey, R.E.M., Neil Young, Twisted Sister, Rolling Stones, Queen, Aerosmith, Wagner, Kenny G, Johnny Cash, Creedence Clearwater Revival, Billy Joel, Bill Conti, John Mellencamp, Joe Esposito, Eye of the Tiger, The Shangri-Las, Cab Calloway, Frankie Valli, The Alan Parsons Project, Paul Rodgers, Travie McCoy, Bruce Springsteen, Led Zeppelin, the London Bach Choir, and the songs of Victor Hugo's Les Misérables.

References

External links 
 Official schedule
 2016 campaign rally videos on C-SPAN

Lists of speeches by speaker
Rallies
Lists of events in the United States
Republican Party (United States) events
Rallies, 2016